Bland J. Finlay FRS (d. 24 December 2021) was a British biologist, and Professor of Microbial Ecology, Queen Mary, University of London. His research focused on the ecology and physiology of single celled eukaryotic microbes (protists), particularly those from low-oxygen habitats.

Works
Tom Fenchel, Bland J. Finlay, Ecology and evolution in anoxic worlds, Oxford University Press, 1995,

References

External links

https://web.archive.org/web/20120426052455/http://www.researchpublications.qmul.ac.uk/publications/staff/21523.html

20th-century British biologists
21st-century British biologists
Academics of Queen Mary University of London
Fellows of the Royal Society
Living people
Year of birth missing (living people)